For the Love o' Lil is a 1930 American drama film directed by James Tinling and starring Jack Mulhall, Sally Starr, Elliott Nugent, Margaret Livingston, and Charles Sellon. The film was released by Columbia Pictures on August 29, 1930.

Cast
Jack Mulhall as Wyn Huntley
Sally Starr as Lil Huntley
Elliott Nugent as Sandy Jenkins
Margaret Livingston as Eleanor Cartwright
Charles Sellon as Mr. Walker
Julia Swayne Gordon as Mrs. Walker
Billy Bevan as Edward O. Walker
Claire Du Brey as Mrs. Gardner
Joan Standing as Chambermaid

References

External links

1930 drama films
American drama films
1930 films
American black-and-white films
Columbia Pictures films
1930s English-language films
Films directed by James Tinling
1930s American films